Riang Kotang fumarole field is located near the eastern tip of Flores island, Indonesia. Two fumarole areas are found along the saddle foot of the volcano. Hot springs appear along the southwest side of the Oka Bay and Hadang Bay on the west coast.

See also 

 List of volcanoes in Indonesia

References 

Volcanoes of the Lesser Sunda Islands